The 2006 Colchester Borough Council election took place on 4 May 2006 to elect members of Colchester Borough Council in Essex, England. One third of the council was up for election and the council stayed under no overall control.

After the election, the composition of the council was
Conservative 30
Liberal Democrats 21
Labour 7
Independent 2

Background
Before the election the Conservatives had run the council since the 2004 election and had 28 of the 60 seats on the council. The Liberal Democrats had 22 seats, Labour had 7 seats and there were 3 independents.

20 seats were contested at the election, with the councillors who were defending seats including the Conservative leader of the council, John Jowers, the mayor Terry Sutton and the Liberal Democrat group leader, Colin Sykes. However the Conservatives did not have a candidate in New Town ward due to an error on their candidate's nomination papers. As well as the parties who were defending seats on the council, the Green Party contested every seat for the first time and particularly targeted Castle ward. Independents who stood included Gerard Oxford in Highwoods ward, who was defending a seat he had won as a Liberal Democrat before leaving the party.

Issues
A major issue at the election was the relocation of the bus station to a temporary site, while a new bus station was being built at a new shopping centre. Meanwhile, a Visual Arts Facility (VAF) was being built on the old bus station site. 6 independents stood at the election as part of a Save Our Bus Station Campaign opposing the move, with the Labour party also opposing the building of the VAF on the old bus station site. However the Conservatives said the temporary bus station site would be better than the old site.

Both the Liberal Democrats and Greens called for more recycling, while the Liberal Democrat and Labour parties called for action on street cleaning. The Conservatives meanwhile defending their record in power, pointing to a number of new projects being started including a planned new community stadium.

Election result
The Conservatives made a net gain of 2 seats to have half of the seats on the council with 30 councillors, just falling short of winning a majority. Conservative gains included defeating the Liberal Democrat group leader Colin Sykes, with the Liberal Democrats falling to 21 seats. Labour remained on 7 seats after holding the only seat they had been defending, but polled less than the Greens in a number of wards. Overall turnout at the election was 36.4%.

Ward results

Berechurch

Birch & Winstree

Castle

Christ Church

Fordham & Stour

Harbour

Highwoods

Lexden

Mile End

New Town

No Conservative candidate as previous (27.5%).

Prettygate

Pyefleet

St Andrew's

St. Anne's

St John's

Shrub End

Stanway

Tiptree

West Bergholt & Eight Ash Green

West Mersea

No Liberal Democrat candidate as previous (14.2%).

References

2006 English local elections
2006
2000s in Essex